Vijayakumar (born 8 May 1968) is an Indian actor who works in Malayalam film industry. He has acted in more than a hundred Malayalam films.

He is an actor who handled hero roles during the 1990s and later he started performing villain roles and character.

Early life
Vijayakumar was born as the second son among three children to producer Henry and Dora on 27 May 1968, at Thiruvananthapuram. His father was a producer of Malayalam movies and mother was a house wife. He has two brothers Hamlet and Rughus and two sisters Prema and Lali. He studied at Lourdes Mount School, Vattappara, Trivandrum. He pursued bachelors in economics from Mahatma Gandhi College, Thiruvananthapuram.
 
He was married to Binu Daniel  . They have two daughters, Arthana and Mekhal Elsa. Arthana made her debut in Mudhugauv a Malayalam movie with Suresh Gopi's son Gokul Suresh.

Filmography

As an actor

 Maadhavikkutty (1973)
 Jungle Boy (1987)
 Thalastaanam (1992) as Unnikrishnan
Rajadhani (1993) - Telugu movie
 Uppukandam Brothers (1993) as James
 Kulapathi (1993) as Udayan
 Bhoomi Geetham (1993) as Sethunathan
 Jackpot (1993) as Nikhil
 Padaleeputhram (1993)
 Sthreedhanam (1993) as Sreeni
 Shudhamaddalam (1994)
 Bharya (1994) as Babukuttan
 Gamanam (1994) as SI Surendran
 Tharavaadu (1994)
 Sagaram Sakshi (1994)
 Rudraksham (1994)
 Napoleon (1994)
 Julee (1994)
 Harichandanam (1994)
 The  (1994)
 Kokkarakko (1995) as Murali
 Karma (1995) as Kannan
 Hijack (1995) as Aravindan
 Parvathy Parinayam (1995) as Assistant Engineer
 Special Squad (1995)
 Praayikkara Paappaan (1995) as Chandran
 Nandagopalante Kusruthikal (1996)
 Sulthan Hyderali (1996) as Rafeeq Rahman
 Dominic Presentation (film) (1996) as Dominic Presentation
 Maanikyakkoodaaram (1997)
 Poomarathanalil (1997)
 Masmaram (1997) as Jerry
 Kannur (1997)
 Lelam (1997) as Sunny Cherian Karimpanal
 Adukkala Rahasyam Angadipattu (1997)
 Kottappurathe Koottukudumbam (1997) as Jayadevan
 Hitler Brothers (1997) as Dr. Gopan
  Ikkareyaanente Maanasam (1997) as Sethukrishnan
 Poothumbiyum Poovalanmarum (1997)
 Draavidan (1998) ... Sahadevan
 Panchaloham (1998)
 Aagosham (1998)
 Harthal (1998)
 Kattathoru Penpoovu (1998) .... Natarajan Chettiyar
 Ilamura Thampuraan (1998) .... Chandrappan
 Amma Ammaayiyamma (1998)...Raghu
 Mattupetti Machan (1998) .... SI
  The Truth (1998) as Reporter Babu
  Panchapaandavar (1999) as Unnikrishnan
  Ezhupunna Tharakan (1999) as Babychan
  Swastham Grihabaranam (1999) as Shibu
  Thachiledathu Chundan (1999) as Murali
  Pathram (1999) as Vincent Peter
 Crime File (1999) as Monayi
  Narasimham (2000) as Jayakrishnan
   Valyettan (2000) as Appu
  Ente Priyappetta Muthuvinu (2000)
 Sradha (2000)
 Nariman (2001) as Manu
 Dubai (2001) as Yousaf
  Praja (2001) as Appu
  Rakshasa Rajavu (2001) as S.P Gopakumar
  Saivar Thirumeni (2001) as Sam
 Thaandavam (2002) as Tomichan
 Onnaaman (2002) as Balan
  Shivam (2002) as Rasheed
   Mr Brahmachaari (2003) as Aravindan
 Kaliyodam (2003)
 The King Maker Leader (2003) as Thulasidaran
 Natturajavu (2004)
 Wanted (2004) as Sreekanth
 Chandrolsavam (2005)
 The Tiger (2005) as Haris C. Khan
 Pathaaka (2006) as Ashraf
 Paradesi (2007)
 Sketch (2007)
 Time (2007)
 Sooryan (2007)
 Alibhai (2007) as Vijay
  Nadiya Kollappetta Rathri (2007) as Balu Madhav
  Maadambi (2008) as Aravindan
 Twenty:20 as Junior Advocate (2008)
 Winter (2009) as Saju Paul IPS
 Shambu (film) (2009) as Sambhu
 Red Chillies (2009)
  Chemistry (2009)
 Janakan as Assistant Commissioner Jayapalan
 Nallavan (2010) as Devan
 Drona 2010 (2010)
 Vande Maatharam (2010)
 Elsamma Enna Aankutty (2010)
 Traffic (2011) as Mathew
 Uppukandam Brothers Back in Action (2011) as James (Video Archieve)
 Sandwich (2011) as Murukan
 Simhasanam (2012) as Chandra Shekaran
 I Love Me (2012) as SI
 Up & Down: Mukalil Oralundu (2013)
 Housefull (2013)
 Angels (2014)
 Mr. Fraud (2014)
 Color Balloon (2014) as Suku
 God's Own Country (2014) as Alex
 Cousins (2014)
 Chirakodinja Kinavukal (2015) as Inspector Pratapachandran
 Ithinumappuram (2015)
 Onnam Loka Mahayudham (2015)
 Jamna Pyari (2015)
 Rajamma @ Yahoo (2015) as Pothen's son
 Anarkali (2015) as Navy Lawyer Chellappan
 Adoorum Thoppilum Allaatha Oru Bhasi (2016)
 IDI (2016) as Alex Idikula
 Aan Mariya Kalippilanu (2016) as James
 Karinkunnam 6's (2016) as Pranchi
 Kannaadi Talkies (2016)
 Thrishvaperoor Kliptham (2017) as Pulikkala Sathyan
 Puthanpanam (2017) as Jamshad
 The Great Father (2017)
 Sarvopari Palakkaran (2017)
 Sherlock Toms (2017) as Commissioner Sathyanarayanan
 Masterpiece (2017) as Professor Kurian Thomas
 Krishnam (2018) as Dr.Savio
 Aabhaasam (2018)
 Purple (2018)
 The Gambler (2019) as Biju
 Pattabhiraman (2019) as Ananthanarayanan
 Kumbarees (2019) as SI Pappan
 Brother's Day (2019) as Alex Kurian
 Driving Licence (2019) as DYSP Joseph Unniyadan
 Cochin Shaadi at Chennai 03 (2020)
 Sara's (2021)
 Karnan Napoleon Bhagat Singh (2022)
 Kaduva (2022)

Producer
 Pratheeksha (1979)
 Thalasthanam (1992)             
 kulapathi (1993)                      * sudinam (1995)

Lyrics
Sahridayare Sahapaadhikale as Nakshathra deepangal	(1989)

References

External links

Indian male film actors
Male actors from Thiruvananthapuram
Male actors in Malayalam cinema
20th-century Indian male actors
21st-century Indian male actors
Living people
Malayalam film producers
Film producers from Thiruvananthapuram
1969 births